Naomi Lang (born December 18, 1978) is an American former competitive ice dancer. With skating partner Peter Tchernyshev, she is a two-time Four Continents champion (2000 and 2002), a five-time U.S. national champion (1999–2003), and competed at the 2002 Olympic Winter Games. Lang is the first Native American female athlete to participate in the Winter Olympics. She is an enrolled member of the Karuk Tribe of California.

Personal life
Naomi Lang was born in Arcata, California to Leslie Dixon and Jason Lang, a member of the Karuk tribe. She started to dance at the age of three and continued with ballet dancing to the age of 15, beginning her training at the Dancer's Studio in Eureka, California. She performed with the Grand Rapids (Michigan) Ballet Co. and studied ballet at the Interlochen Arts Academy where at the age of 12 she received an award for 'Outstanding Achievement in Ballet'. She graduated from Lake Placid high school, Lake Placid, NY; in 1997.

In 2004, Lang had a daughter, Lillia Ashlee, with Ukrainian ice acrobat Vladimir Besedin. She married American ice dancer Mark Fitzgerald in August 2008 in Tarrytown, New York. She gave birth to a son, Mason Daniel, on November 14, 2009, and a second daughter, Madelyn Christina, on August 15, 2013. She and Mark Fitzgerald divorced in 2016.

Since then she has married Jeffrey Strong, and they have two children together. Their daughter, Elora Ivy, was born on November 7, 2016, and their son, Sebastian Joseph, was born on December 3, 2018. The family resides in Gilbert, Arizona.

Skating career
Lang started skating when she was eight, after seeing Smurfs On Ice. She began competitive ice dance with John Lee, winning the 1995 U.S. Novice title and the 1996 U.S. Junior silver medal.

Partnership with Tchernyshev
Having noticed her at U.S. Nationals, Peter Tchernyshev wrote her a letter in mid-1996 asking for a tryout. They had a successful tryout in Lake Placid, New York and trained there for nine months with Natalia Dubova; then, due to Lang's homesickness, they moved to Detroit and began training with Igor Shpilband and Elizabeth Coates.

Lang/Tchernyshev first won the U.S. national title in 1999. The following season, they took gold at the 2000 Four Continents Championships and placed 8th at the 2000 World Championships. They also performed with Champions on Ice.

In 2000, Lang/Tchernyshev moved to Hackensack, New Jersey to train with Alexander Zhulin, who coached them until the end of the 2001–02 season. They missed their 2001 Grand Prix events because Tchernyshev had shin splits. Returning to competition, they won their fourth national title at the 2002 U.S. Championships and then won their second Four Continents title. They placed eleventh at the 2002 Winter Olympics and ninth at the 2002 World Championships.

In 2002–03, Lang/Tchernyshev were coached by Nikolai Morozov. After missing their 2002 Grand Prix events due to an injury to Lang, the duo won their fifth national title at the 2003 U.S. Championships, took bronze at the 2003 Four Continents, and placed 8th at the 2003 World Championships.

Lang/Tchernyshev did not appear internationally in the 2003–04 season. They intended to compete at the 2004 U.S. Championships but withdrew after Lang re-injured her Achilles tendon. They announced their competitive retirement in February 2004. The duo continued to skate together professionally and appeared in several U.S. ice shows, including many of the Disson skating shows televised on NBC and the Hallmark Channel. They also toured extensively in Europe and Russia, performing in Art on Ice, Kings on Ice with Evgeni Plushenko and composer and violinist Edvin Marton, and the Katarina Witt Farewell Tour. They performed at Jim Carrey's private Christmas party in Hollywood.

Lang works at The Ice Den Chandler/Scottsdale as the Manager of Ice Dance.

Programs 
(with Tchernyshev)

Results 
(with Tchernyshev)

(with Lee)

See also
 Mabel Fairbanks

References

External links 

 Official site
 
 Care to Ice Dance? - Lang & Tchernyshev

Navigation 

1978 births
20th-century Native Americans
21st-century Native Americans
Living people
American female ice dancers
Figure skaters at the 2002 Winter Olympics
Olympic figure skaters of the United States
Native American sportspeople
Four Continents Figure Skating Championships medalists
People from Arcata, California
20th-century Native American women
21st-century Native American women
Karuk